Heinrichite  is a monoclinic-prismatic containing arsenic, barium, hydrogen, oxygen, and uranium. The mineral is named after Eberhardt William Heinrich (1918–1991) who first noted it in 1958 in the U.S. State of Oregon.

Description 
Heinrichite is radioactive pale green, pale yellow mineral. Heinrichite fluoresces light-green in longwave and shortwave ultraviolet. Because of its uranium content, the mineral is radioactive.

References 

Uranium(VI) minerals
Arsenate minerals